The Cathedral Quarter Arts Festival is an annual festival of music, comedy, theatre, art and literature that takes place in Belfast, Northern Ireland. The festival was established in late 1999 and the first festival took place in May 2000. It has since primarily taken place in the first weeks of May in an area of Belfast known as the Cathedral Quarter, so-called because of its proximity to St Anne's Cathedral. Regarded these days for its socially inclusive agenda and its eclectic programming blend of "big names", emerging acts and fringe performances, The Cathedral Quarter Arts Festival began life in May 2000 attracting an audience of just over 5,000. The Festival now regularly attracts over 60,000 people to over 150 events in Belfast's city centre.

See also
Belfast Festival at Queen's
Belfast Film Festival
Cathedral Quarter, Belfast
Féile an Phobail

References

External links
 Cathedral Quarter Arts Festival Website

Arts festivals in Northern Ireland
Spring (season) events in Northern Ireland
Festivals in Belfast